Gharghoda is a town and a nagar panchayat in Raigarh district  in the state of Chhattisgarh, India.

Geography
It has an average elevation of 258 metres (846 feet).

Demographics
 India census, Gharghoda had a population of 8103. Males constitute 50% of the population and females 50%. Gharghoda has an average literacy rate of 65%, higher than the national average of 59.5%: male literacy is 76%, and female literacy is 54%.

References

Cities and towns in Raigarh district